This is a list of series released by or aired on TVB Jade Channel in 1990.

First line series
These dramas aired in Hong Kong from 7:25pm to 8:25pm, Monday to Friday on TVB.

Second line series
These dramas aired in Hong Kong from 8:45pm to 9:15pm, Monday to Friday on TVB.

Third line series
These dramas aired in Hong Kong from 9:15pm to 10:15pm, Monday to Friday on TVB.

Other series

Warehoused series
These dramas were released overseas and have not broadcast on TVB Jade Channel.

External links
TVB.com Official Website 

TVB dramas
1990 in Hong Kong television